Todd Bensley (born September 26, 1960) is an American sports shooter. He competed at the 1984 Summer Olympics and the 1988 Summer Olympics.

References

External links
 

1960 births
Living people
American male sport shooters
Olympic shooters of the United States
Shooters at the 1984 Summer Olympics
Shooters at the 1988 Summer Olympics
Sportspeople from Augusta, Georgia
Pan American Games medalists in shooting
Pan American Games silver medalists for the United States
Shooters at the 1987 Pan American Games
Medalists at the 1987 Pan American Games